Lori A. Saine is an American politician serving as a member of the Weld County Board of Commissioners. Previously, she served as a Republican member of the Colorado House of Representatives for the 63rd district from January 9, 2013 to January 13, 2021. Saine was a candidate for Colorado's 8th congressional district, but lost the Republican primary, coming in third place.

Education
Saine earned a Bachelor of Arts degree in psychology, business, and biology from Indiana University Bloomington.

Career 
Prior to entering politics, Saine worked as a regional sales director. She was also a member of the Dacono City Council. She was elected to the Colorado House of Representatives in November 2012 and assumed office in January 2013. During her final term in the House, Saine served as a vice chair of the Legislative Audit Committee.

When Republican Representative Jon Becker left the Legislature and left the District 63 seat open, Saine won the June 26, 2012, Republican primary with 3,444 votes (93%) against a write-in candidate, and won the November 6, 2012 General election with 21,162 votes (56%) against Democratic nominee Tim Erickson who had run for a House seat in 2004.

In December 2017, Saine was arrested at Denver International Airport for carrying a loaded handgun through security. Saine said she did not know that her gun was in her purse when she went to the airport. No charges were pressed.

In January 2019, Saine was criticized by Democrat Leslie Herod for inaccurately equating the lynchings of African-Americans with that of whites during the Reconstruction era following the Civil War.

In December 2020, in her role as chair of the Legislative Audit Committee, she held a hearing to examine allegations of fraud and irregularities during Colorado's 2020 elections amid Donald Trump's false claims of fraud in the presidential election. The hearing ultimately found no evidence of electoral irregularities or fraud.

In 2020, Saine was term-limited as a state representative. In the 2020 general election, she was elected to the Weld County Board of County Commissioners.

In November 2021, Saine announced her candidacy for Colorado's 8th congressional district in the 2022 elections. She lost to Barbara Kirkmeyer in the Republican primary.

References

External links
 Official page at the Colorado General Assembly
 Congressional campaign site
 Biography at Ballotpedia
 

21st-century American politicians
21st-century American women politicians
Candidates in the 2022 United States House of Representatives elections
County commissioners in Colorado
Indiana University Bloomington alumni
Living people
Republican Party members of the Colorado House of Representatives
People from Weld County, Colorado
Place of birth missing (living people)
Women state legislators in Colorado
Year of birth missing (living people)